Barkeol  is a city and commune in Mauritania. In 1999, 50% of Dracunculiasis cases in Mauritania were reported from Barkeol.

References

Communes of Assaba Region